The Volta Regional Minister is the Ghana government official who is responsible for overseeing the administration of the Volta Region of Ghana. The boundaries of the Volta Region have changed at various times in Ghana's history. Following the December 2018 referendums, the region has been divided into two with the northern part becoming the Oti Region and the southern part remaining as the Volta Region. There are currently sixteen administrative regions in Ghana.

List of Volta Regional Ministers

See also

Ministers of the Ghanaian Government
Volta Region
Trans-Volta Togoland

Notes

Politics of Ghana
Volta Regional Minister